Allen Young (born June 30, 1941) is an American journalist, author, editor and publisher who is also a social, political and environmental activist.

Early life

Allen Young, born in Liberty, New York, on June 30, 1941, to Rae (Goldfarb) Young and Louis Young. His parents, both secular Jews, spent their youth in New York City, then relocated to the hamlet of Glen Wild (estimated pop. 100) in Fallsburg in the foothills of the Catskills, and started a poultry farm, also providing accommodations for summer tourists in this region known as the Borscht Belt.  He was a red diaper baby.  He graduated from Fallsburg Central High School and received his undergraduate degree in 1962 from Columbia College, Columbia University. Following an M.A. in 1963 from Stanford University in Hispanic American and Luso-Brazilian Studies, he earned an M.S. in 1964 from the Columbia University Graduate School of Journalism. After receiving a Fulbright Award in 1964, Young spent three years in Brazil, Chile and other Latin American countries, contributing numerous articles to The New York Times, The Christian Science Monitor and other periodicals.

Activism

Liberation News Service and protest
Young returned to the United States in June 1967 and worked briefly for The Washington Post before resigning in the fall of that year to become a full-time anti-Vietnam War movement activist and staff member of the Liberation News Service.  Young, Marshall Bloom, Ray Mungo and others worked in the office at 3 Thomas Circle producing the news packets that were sent to the hundreds of underground newspapers bi-weekly or tri-weekly. A member of the Students for a Democratic Society he was part of the Columbia University protests of 1968 and was among more than 700 arrested. When the Liberation News Service split in two in August 1968 Young became a recognized leader of the New York office.

Venceremos Brigade
In February and March 1969 Young went to Cuba, where he was instrumental in the organization of the Venceremos Brigade. Young became disillusioned with the Castro regime after observing the lack of civil liberties and other freedoms, and especially the government's anti-gay policies. After the Mariel Boatlift he wrote Gays Under the Cuban Revolution, breaking with those New Leftists who continued to defend the Cuban Revolution.

Gay Liberation movement
After the Stonewall riots in New York City, Young became involved in the Gay Liberation Front. During the second half of 1970 he lived in the Seventeenth Street collective with Carl Miller, Jim Fouratt, and Giles Kotcher   where he was involved in producing Gay flames.  Young wrote frequently for the gay press, including The Advocate, Come out!, Fag Rag, and Gay Community News among others. His 1972 interview with Allen Ginsberg, which first appeared in Gay Sunshine is often reprinted and translated.

Young has edited four books with Karla Jay including the ground breaking anthology Out of the Closets.

Continuing activism
Young moved to rural Massachusetts in 1973 to an 'intentional community'. Carrying a sign which read Royalston, Mass. population 973 he attended the National March on Washington for Lesbian and Gay Rights.    He was a reporter and assistant editor for the Athol Daily News from 1979 to 1989, and Director of Community Relations for the Athol, Massachusetts Memorial Hospital, 1989 to 1999.  He joined the Montague Nuclear Power Plant protests shortly after Sam Lovejoy's toppling of the weather tower in 1974. He has served on the board of directors of the Mount Grace Land Conservation Trust, and in 2004 received the Writing and Society Award from the University of Massachusetts Amherst English Department "honoring a distinguished career of commitment to the work of writing in the world." Since 2009, he has been writing a weekly column, entitled Inside/Outside, for the Athol Daily News.

Works and publications

Edited anthologies
 With Karla Jay.
 With Karla Jay.
 With Karla Jay.

References

External links 
 Young, Allen (1990) "Liberation News Service: A History"
 Land protection
 Gay Sunshine interview with Allen Ginsberg
 Pride 2008 Gay Spirit Radio broadcast
 Allen Young papers
 June 30 2011 interview with Jonah Raskin
 Program of the 1979 National March on Washington for Gay and Lesbian Rights
 Review of The gay report
 Rainbow History oral history
 Liberation News Service archive

1941 births
Living people
American anti–Vietnam War activists
American male journalists
People from Fallsburg, New York
American LGBT rights activists
Gay Liberation Front members
American gay writers
Columbia University Graduate School of Journalism alumni
LGBT Jews
People from Liberty, New York
Columbia College (New York) alumni
Stanford University alumni
21st-century American LGBT people